Lucien Martinet (born 1878, date of death unknown) was a French rower who competed in the 1900 Summer Olympics.

He was a member of the French club Société Nautique de la Marne and his team won the silver medal in the coxed pair.

References

External links

1878 births
French male rowers
Olympic rowers of France
Rowers at the 1900 Summer Olympics
Olympic silver medalists for France
Olympic medalists in rowing
Year of death missing
Medalists at the 1900 Summer Olympics
European Rowing Championships medalists
Date of birth missing
Place of birth missing
Place of death missing